A car wash is a facility for cleaning automobiles. It may also refer to:

Arts, entertainment, and media

Films and soundtracks
 Car Wash (film), a 1976 film
 Car Wash (soundtrack), a soundtrack album to the 1976 film
 "Car Wash" (song), a song by Rose Royce from the 1976 film soundtrack, later covered by Christina Aguilera and Missy Elliott

Television
(Alphabetical by series title)
 "Car Wash" (1999), a season 3 episode of Ally McBeal
 "Car Wash" (sometimes "Carwash") (1993), a season 3 episode of Beavis and Butt-head
 "Car Wash" (2000), a season 2 episode of Cousin Skeeter
 "Car Wash" (2008), a season 2 episode of Genie in the House
 "Car Wash" (2008), a season 15 episode of Modern Marvels
 "Car Wash" (2005), an episode of MTV's The 70s House
 "Car Wash" (2001), an episode of The Geena Davis Show
 "Car Wash" (2003), a season 1 episode of The Sleepover Club

Other arts, entertainment, and media
 Car Wash, a character in the BBC television series Willo the Wisp
 "Car Wash", a song by Bruce Springsteen of his rarities collection boxset Tracks (1998)
 "Car Wash", a skit on Rob Schneider's comedy album Registered Offender (2010)

Law enforcement
 Operation Car Wash (Portuguese: Operação Lava Jato), an anti-corruption investigation in Brazil